The Battle of Sezawa was the first major battle fought by Takeda Shingen in his campaign to gain control of Shinano Province. He took on and defeated a coalition of Shinano daimyō including the leaders of the Suwa, Ogasawara and  clans.

Background 
Shingen's campaigns in Shinano took place during Japan's 16th-century Sengoku period, also known as the "Age of Civil War". After the Ōnin War (1467–77), the shōgun largely lost control of the country beyond the immediate vicinity of the capital Kyoto, and local warlords (daimyōs) quickly sprang up to fill the resulting power vacuum, warring constantly with one another and building yamajiro ("mountain castles") to control territory.

In some parts of Japan a single daimyō was able to control an entire province, and such was the case in Kai Province, northwest of modern Tokyo, which was dominated by the Takeda clan. However, to the north of Kai was the sprawling, mountainous Shinano Province, in which a number of relatively weak warlords coexisted, among them the Suwa, Ogasawara,  and Takato clans. The fragmentation of power in Shinano, and its strategic position in the middle of Honshu, made it an attractive target to its more powerful neighbours, and in the 1530s Takeda Shingen's father, Takeda Nobutora, made a probing expedition into the province. The campaign met with mixed success, although the young Shingen (then called Harunobu) did distinguish himself by his bravery and leadership at the 1536 Battle of Un no Kuchi).

Battle
In 1541 Shingen usurped his father and became the leader of the Takeda clan, and he subsequently resolved to mount his own invasion of Shinano. At this time Suwa Yorishige, a daimyō of southwest Shinano, was involved in a dispute with a shrine near Lake Suwa, and this provided Shingen with the necessary pretext to invade. He declared war on Suwa and in 1542 led his army into Shinano, but in doing so he provoked a coalition of Shinano lords to form against him, led by Yorishige, Ogasawara Nagatoki, Murakami Yoshikiyo, and Kiso Yoshiyasu.  

As a result Shingen was greatly outnumbered when the two sides met at Sezawa, to the southeast of Lake Suwa, but he decided to give battle anyway and took the gamble of launching a night attack through misty rain. The gamble paid off and he succeeded in routing the allied forces. In doing so he had won a startling victory, for the allies had gathered a force of 12,000 Shinano warriors, but Shingen defeated them all, with just 3,000 men; moreover he succeeded in inflicting about 3,000 casualties, while Shingen's forces suffered about 500 losses.

Aftermath
After the disaster at Sezawa the anti-Takeda coalition fell apart, and Murakami and Ogasawara retreated to their territories in northern Shinano, leaving the Suwa at the mercy of Shingen, who overran their territory later that year. Over the next eleven years Shingen gradually worked his way northwards through Shinano and seemingly completed the conquest of the province in 1553 after seizing the last Murakami stronghold at Katsurao. However his success alarmed the Uesugi clan of Echigo Province (bordering Shinano to the north), and they subsequently invaded, leading to the famous Battles of Kawanakajima between Shingen and Uesugi Kenshin.

Sources

References

1542 in Japan
Sezawa 1542
Sezawa